The 45th District of the Iowa Senate is located in eastern Iowa, and is currently composed of Scott County.

Current elected officials
Jim Lykam is the senator currently representing the 45th District.

The area of the 45th District contains two Iowa House of Representatives districts:
The 89th District (represented by Monica Kurth)
The 90th District (represented by Cindy Winckler)

The district is also located in Iowa's 2nd congressional district, which is represented by Mariannette Miller-Meeks.

Past senators
The district has previously been represented by:

Norman Rodgers, 1983–1985
James Riordan, 1986–1992
 Bill Fink, 1993–2002
David Miller, 2003–2006
Becky Schmitz, 2007–2010
Sandy Greiner, 2011–2012
Joe Seng, 2013–2016
Jim Lykam, 2017–present

References

45